Salamis augustina is a butterfly in the family Nymphalidae. It is found on Mauritius and Réunion.

Adults closely resemble Euploea euphon, of which it may be a mimic. They are on wing from April to May. Subspecies vinsoni is on wing from April to September.

Subspecies
Salamis augustina augustina — La Reunion
Salamis augustina vinsoni Le Cerf, 1922 — Mauritius

References

Butterflies described in 1833
Junoniini
Taxa named by Jean Baptiste Boisduval